Abbas Shah (died August 1498), also known as Gharib Mirza and with the regnal name of al-Mustansir Billah III, was the 34th imam of the Qasim-Shahi branch of the Nizari Isma'ili community.

He succeeded his father, Abd al-Salam Shah, upon his death in 1493–4, at Anjudan. According to oral Nizari tradition, he died in 1496–7, but the inscription in his mausoleum gives the date as August 1498. According to Nizari tradition, he was succeeded by his son Abu Dharr Ali, known as Nur al-Din.

References

Sources

 
 

1498 deaths
Nizari imams
15th-century Iranian people
Iranian Ismailis
15th-century Ismailis
15th-century Islamic religious leaders
People from Markazi Province